The 2022 New Hampshire House of Representatives election was held in the U.S. state of New Hampshire on November 8, 2022, to elect all 400 members of the House of Representatives of the 168th New Hampshire General Court.

A primary election was held in many districts on September 13, 2022. The election coincided with the election of the other house of the General Court, the New Hampshire Senate, and other elections. 

The results showed a near-tied House, with the deciding seat coming down to Manchester Ward 6, initially reported to have been won by Republican Larry Gagne by 23 votes. Due to the extraordinarily close margin of the victory, a series of recounts and legal challenges have followed, leaving the state of the race presently uncertain. The race has gained national attention, due to both its close nature and its pivotal role in deciding control of the state House.

Summary of results

Retiring incumbents
94 incumbent Representatives (58 Democrats, 35 Republicans and one Independent) did not seek reelection in 2022:
Note: Districts shown are pre-redistricting

Belknap 2: Jonathan Mackie (R)
Belknap 2: Timothy Lang Sr. (R) (running for State Senate)
Carroll 8: William Marsh (D) (running for State Senate)
Cheshire 2: John Mann (D)
Cheshire 4: Lawrence Welkowitz (D)
Cheshire 7: Sparky Von Plinsky (D)
Cheshire 8: Donovan Fenton (D) (running for State Senate)
Cheshire 9: Andrew Maneval (D)
Cheshire 12: Jennie Gomarlo (D)
Cheshire 13: Ben Kilanski (R)
Cheshire 16: William Pearson (D)
Coös 1: Dennis Thompson (D)
Coös 3: Larry Laflamme (D)
Coös 3: Robert Theberge (R) (running for County Commissioner)
Coös 4: Kevin Craig (R)
Coös 5: Edith Tucker (D) (running for State Senate)
Grafton 1: Joseph DePalma (R)
Grafton 8: Suzanne Smith (D)
Grafton 8: Joyce Weston (D)
Grafton 9: Ned Gordon (R)
Grafton 10: Roger Dontonville (D)
Grafton 11: Beth Folsom (R)
Grafton 12: Richard Abel (D)
Grafton 15: David Binford (R)
Hillsborough 1: Marjorie Porter (D)
Hillsborough 7: Barbara Griffin (R) (running for State Senate)
Hillsborough 7: John Graham (R)
Hillsborough 7: Sue Mullen (D)
Hillsborough 7: Niki Kelsey (R)
Hillsborough 9: Iz Piedra (D)
Hillsborough 11: Nicole Klein-Knight (D)
Hillsborough 15: Erika Conner (D)
Hillsborough 17: Timothy Smith (D)
Hillsborough 18: Willis Griffith (D)
Hillsborough 19: Kendall Snow (D)
Hillsborough 25: Paul Somero (R)
Hillsborough 28: Bruce Cohen (D)
Hillsborough 28: Janice Schmidt (D)
Hillsborough 29: Paul Bergeron (D)
Hillsborough 30: Patricia Klee (D)
Hillsborough 31: Manny Espitia (D)
Hillsborough 32: Dan Toomey (D)
Hillsborough 33: Mark King (D)
Hillsborough 34: Melbourne Moran (D)
Hillsborough 34: Deb Stevens (D)
Hillsborough 37: Andrew Renzullo (R)
Hillsborough 37: Kim Rice (R)
Hillsborough 37: Denise Smith (R)
Hillsborough 39: John Burt (R)
Hillsborough 45: Connie Van Houten (D)
Merrimack 6: Rod Pimentel (D)
Merrimack 8: Carolette Alicea (D)
Merrimack 17: Safiya Wazir (D)
Merrimack 19: Christy Bartlett (D)
Merrimack 23: Samantha Fox (D)
Merrimack 23: Mary Beth Walz (D)
Merrimack 23: Gary Woods (D)
Merrimack 24: Michael Yakubovich (R) (running for State Senate)
Merrimack 26: Howard Pearl (R) (running for State Senate)
Rockingham 2: Alan Bershtein (R)
Rockingham 3: Paul Ayer (R)
Rockingham 3: Dustin Dodge (R)
Rockingham 5: Al Baldasaro (R)
Rockingham 5: Betsy McKinney (R)
Rockingham 6: Mary Ann Kimball (R)
Rockingham 8: Daryl Abbas (R) (running for State Senate)
Rockingham 8: Bob Elliott (R)
Rockingham 8: Everett McBride (R)
Rockingham 9: Sean Morrison (R)
Rockingham 13: David Welch (R)
Rockingham 14: Norman Major (R)
Rockingham 14: Peter Torosian (R) (running for State Senate)
Rockingham 17: Ellen Read (I)
Rockingham 19: Debra Altschiller (D) (running for State Senate)
Rockingham 21: Tom Loughman (D)
Rockingham 25: Laura Pantelakos (D)
Rockingham 27: Peter Somssich (D)
Strafford 1: Peter Hayward (R)
Strafford 5: Jeffrey Salloway (D)
Strafford 6: Judith Spang (D)
Strafford 7: Timothy Fontneau (D)
Strafford 8: Donna Ellis (D)
Strafford 13: Casey Conley (D)
Strafford 14: Kristina Fargo (D)
Strafford 15: Ariel Oxaal (D)
Strafford 16: Sherry Frost (D)
Strafford 13: Casey Conley (D)
Strafford 18: Wendy Chase (D)
Strafford 21: Catt Sandler (D)
Strafford 24: Susan DeLemus (R) (running for County Commissioner)''
Strafford 25: Amanda Gourgue (D)
Sullivan 1: Lee Oxenham (D)
Sullivan 2: Sue Gottling (D)
Sullivan 6: John Callum (R)

Defeated incumbents

In the primary
Belknap 4: Mike Sylvia (R)
Belknap 6: Glen Aldrich (R)
Belknap 6: Gregg Hough (R)
Belknap 6: Norm Silber (R)
Carroll 6: Brodie Deshaies (R)
Cheshire 7: John Bordenet (D)
Cheshire 15: Paul Berch (D)

In the general election
Belknap 5: Dawn Johnson (R)
Belknap 5: Richard Littlefield (R)
Carroll 1: Karen Umberger (R)
Carroll 8: Jerry Knirk (D)
Grafton 1: Timothy Egan (D)
Grafton 3: Bonnie Ham (R)
Grafton 7: Mark Alliegro (R)

Detailed results

References 

New Hampshire House of Representatives elections
House of Representatives
New Hampshire House of Representatives